The Bicton Woodland Railway is a narrow-gauge railway running in Bicton Park Botanical Gardens in the grounds of Bicton House near Budleigh Salterton in Devon.

The line was built in 1962 as a tourist attraction for visitors to the house. Most of the rolling stock was acquired from the Royal Arsenal Railway, Woolwich, with two locomotives, Woolwich and Carnegie coming from that source, as well as seven goods wagons which were reduced to their frames and converted to passenger carriages. It opened to passengers in 1963. Originally locomotives and carriages had royal blue livery.

Additional rolling stock was acquired from the RAF Fauld railway and the internal railway of the LNWR Wolverton works.

In 1998, the Bicton Gardens were put up for sale and the railway put into hiatus. The new owners sold the line's existing stock, and in 2000 took delivery of a 5.5-tonne diesel-powered replica tank engine. The line's original equipment was purchased by the Waltham Abbey Royal Gunpowder Mills museum at Waltham Abbey.

Locomotives

See also
 British narrow gauge railways

References

External links
Bicton Woodland Railway

18 in gauge railways in England
Tourist attractions in Devon